Maurice Mewis (16 September 1929 – 23 February 2017) was a Belgian wrestler. He competed at the 1952 Summer Olympics, the 1956 Summer Olympics, the 1960 Summer Olympics and the 1964 Summer Olympics.

References

External links
 

1929 births
2017 deaths
Belgian male sport wrestlers
Olympic wrestlers of Belgium
Wrestlers at the 1952 Summer Olympics
Wrestlers at the 1956 Summer Olympics
Wrestlers at the 1960 Summer Olympics
Wrestlers at the 1964 Summer Olympics
Sportspeople from Antwerp
20th-century Belgian people